Carex pseudobicolor is a tussock-forming species of perennial sedge in the family Cyperaceae. It is native to parts of Asia from Afghanistan and Pakistan in the west to Tibet in the east.

See also
List of Carex species

References

pseudobicolor
Taxa named by Johann Otto Boeckeler
Plants described in 1888
Flora of Afghanistan
Flora of Pakistan
Flora of Tibet